The 1994–95 Washington State Cougars men's basketball team represented Washington State University for the 1994–95 NCAA Division I men's basketball season. Led by first-year head coach Kevin Eastman, the Cougars were members of the Pacific-10 Conference and played their home games on campus at Beasley Coliseum in Pullman, Washington.

There was no conference tournament this season; last played in 1990, it resumed in 2002.

For the second time, Washington State played in the National Invitation Tournament, and advanced to the 

Eastman, who previously led UNC Wilmington, was hired in May 1994.

Postseason results

|-
!colspan=5 style=| National Invitation Tournament

References

External links
Sports Reference – Washington State Cougars: 1994–95 basketball season

Washington State Cougars men's basketball seasons
Washington State Cougars
Washington State Cougars
Washington State
Washington State